Macrobathra alternatella is a moth in the family Cosmopterigidae. It was described by Francis Walker in 1864. It is found in Australia, where it has been recorded from Queensland.

References

Macrobathra
Moths described in 1864